Alan Rex Miller (27 October 1925 – 18 March 2006) was an Australian rules footballer who played for South Melbourne in the Victorian Football League (VFL).

Miller, a forward, was recruited to South Melbourne from South Surfers. He kicked a bag of five goals in just his third league game, against Geelong at Lake Oval. In 1950 he kicked 21 goals for the season and played his last game for the club the following year.

His son, Greg Miller, also played for South Melbourne.

References

1925 births
Australian rules footballers from Hobart
Sydney Swans players
2006 deaths